The Department of Industry, Tourism and Resources was an Australian government department that existed between November 2001 and December 2007.

Scope
Information about the department's functions and/or government funding allocation could be found in the Administrative Arrangements Orders, the annual Portfolio Budget Statements, in the Department's annual reports and on the Department's website.

At its creation, the Department was responsible for the following:
Manufacturing and commerce, including industry and market development
Industry innovation policy and technology diffusion
Promotion of industrial research and development
Mineral and energy industries, including oil and gas, and electricity
Energy-specific international organisations and activities
Biotechnology, excluding gene technology regulation
Export services 
Energy and resources science and research
Geoscience research and information services
Marketing, including export promotion, of manufactures and services
Investment promotion and facilitation
Enterprise improvement 
Tourism industry 
Construction industry 
Small business policy and implementation, including business entry point management
Facilitation of the development of service industries generally 
Bounties on the production of goods 
Patents of inventions and designs, and trade marks 
Country of origin labelling 
Weights and measures standards 
Civil space issues 
Analytical laboratory services 
Geodesy, mapping, remote sensing and land information co-ordination 
Ionospheric prediction 
Administration of export controls on energy products

Structure
The Department was an Australian Public Service department, staffed by officials who were responsible to the Minister for Industry, Tourism and Resources, Ian Macfarlane. The Secretary of the Department was Mark I. Paterson.

References

Ministries established in 2001
Industry, Tourism and Resources